Bekçitepe is a village in the Sivrice District of Elazığ Province in Turkey. Its population is 110 (2021). The village is populated by Kurds.

References

Villages in Sivrice District
Kurdish settlements in Elazığ Province